John Parker (born 5 August 1938) is a British author and journalist.

After leaving school, Parker found work at the Northampton Chronicle and Echo and worked in a number of local newspapers before getting a job in the Bahamas with the Nassau Daily Tribune. After working for Life, he returned to the UK to work for the Daily Mirror as a sub-editor.

Books
Parker has had more than 40 books published in hardback, including several on military and investigative topics and a number of biographies.

King of Fools 1988 (on the Duke of Windsor)
Five for Hollywood 1989
The Princess Royal 1989
Prince Philip: A Critical Biography 1990
The Trial of Rock Hudson 1990
The Queen 1991
The Joker's Wild: The Biography of Jack Nicholson 1991
Warren Beatty: The Last Great Lover of Hollywood 1993
Sean Connery 1993
At the Heart of Darkness: Witchcraft, Black Magic and Satanism in Britain Today 1993
Elvis: The Secret Files 1993
Elvis: Murdered by the Mob 1993
Polanski 1993
Richard Gere: The Flesh and the Spirit 1995 
The Walking Dead: A Woman's Brave Stand Against the Mafia 1995
De Niro 1996
The Killing Factory: The Top Secret World of Germ and Chemical Warfare 1996
Bruce Willis: The Unauthorised Biography 1997
Inside the Foreign Legion: The Sensational Story of the World's Toughest Army 1998
The Gurkhas: The Inside Story of the World's Most Feared Soldiers 1999
Death of a Hero: Captain Robert Nairac, GC and the Undercover War in Northern Ireland 1999
Commandos: The Inside Story of Britain's Most Elite Fighting Force 2000
Total Surveillance: Investigating the Big Brother World of e-Spies, Eavesdroppers and CCTV 2000
The Silent Service: The Inside Story of the Royal Navy's Submarine Heroes 2001
Strike Command: The Inside Story of the RAF's Warfare Heroes 2002
Task Force: Untold Stories of the Heroes of the Royal Navy 2003
SBS: The Inside Story of the Special Boat Service 2003
Secret Hero: The Life and Mysterious Death of Captain Robert Nairac 2004
Desert Rats: From El Alamein to Basra 2005
Black Watch: The Inside Story of the Oldest Highland Regiment in the British Army 2005
Wild: The Biography of Jack Nicholson 2005
Royal Marines Commandos: The Inside Story of a Force for the Future 2006
The Submarine: An Illustrated History from 1900 to 1950 2008
Robert De Niro: Portrait of a Legend 2009
Arise, Sir Sean Connery 2009
Modern Submarines: An Illustrated Reference Guide to Underwater Vessels of the World 2009
Michael Douglas: Acting on Instinct 2011
The Paras: The Inside Story of Britain's Toughest Regiment 2012
The Gurkhas: An Updated In-Depth Investigation into the History and Mystique of the Gurkha Regiments 2013
The Rocky Road: From Japanese Occupation to Rock & Roll Stardom 2013 (with Tony Rocco)
The Illustrated Encyclopedia of Destroyers, Frigates & Submarines: A History of Destroyers, Frigates and Underwater Vessels from Around the World 2015 (with Bernard Ireland)
Jack Nicholson: The Biography 2017

References

External links
 The Official John Parker website 

1938 births
Living people
British biographers